Pitts Hill is a small village in Stoke-on-Trent. The village was served by the Pitts Hill railway station from 1874 to 1964 which was on the Potteries Loop Line. The station is now a fishing lake.

References

Villages in Staffordshire